Dorinea Shirley (1 April 1899 - 3 July 1973) was a British actress of the silent era.

Selected filmography
 Open Country (1922)
 Petticoat Loose (1922)
 The Call of the East (1922)
 Greywater Park (1924)
 Claude Duval (1926)
 Nell Gwyn (1926)
 Motherland (1927)
 Afterwards (1928)
 Zero (1928)

References

External links

1899 births
1973 deaths
English film actresses
English silent film actresses
20th-century English actresses